The Flood Plain Lower Ringarooma River wetlands is a wetland site comprises the floodplain of the lower Ringarooma River in north-eastern Tasmania, Australia. In 1982 it was designated a wetland of international importance under the Ramsar Convention.

Description
It lies between the towns of Tomahawk to the west and Gladstone to the south-east. Geologically, it consists of Quaternary clays, sands and gravels with silty clay soil overlying deep grey sands. The silt is derived from erosion in the river catchment caused by tin mining. The average annual rainfall is 625–750 mm.

Flora and fauna
The site is vegetated with shrubland and tussock grassland and surrounded by woodland. Several plants that are rare or threatened in Tasmania, including Centipeda minima, Polygonum strigosum, Lythrum salicaria  and Villarsia exaltata, occur there. It also provides secure feeding and nesting habitat for many waterbirds. The area is used for livestock grazing as well as regulated waterfowl hunting.

References

Ramsar sites in Australia
North East Tasmania
Floodplains of Australia